Olivia Cîmpian (born 1 January 2001) is a Romanian artistic gymnast. At the 2016 Junior European Women's Artistic Gymnastics Championships she won the bronze medal with the Romanian team. She also competed at the 2017 European Women's Artistic Gymnastics Championships for Romania. However, as of July 2017, Cimpian has expressed her desire to compete for Hungary in future international meets. She eventually left for Hungary in July, and her nationality change became official in October. Since athletes won’t be eligible to compete for a country for one year after they change nationality, Cimpian will barely be eligible for selection to Hungary’s team for the 2018 world championships. However that change was never official and Olivia decided she would compete again for Romania. 

In 2020, Cîmpian was featured as one of the athletes in the music video for the Robin Schulz song All We Got.

Competitive history

References

External links
 
 Olivia Cîmpian at the Romanian Olympic and Sports Committee

2001 births
Living people
Romanian female artistic gymnasts
Place of birth missing (living people)
Sportspeople from Arad, Romania
21st-century Romanian women